In Tunisian football, the Tunis derby is the local derby between the two major clubs in the city of Tunis, Tunisia – Club Africain and Espérance. The derby is played in Tunis in the Hammadi Agrebi stadium due to its larger capacity of 65,000 seats. Before the construction of this stadium, the derby used to be played in the 45,000 seat-capacity Stade El Menzah.

History 

The derbies between the Club Africain and Esperance sportive de Tunis (EST) start during the season 1923–1924, when the African Club joins the EST in second series (promotion 1): the first official derby, which takes place on March 23, 1924, at the Ariana on behalf of the fifth day of the championship of the second series, is won by the African Club (3-0). Tunisia's first Cup derby, which takes place on October 10, 1926, at the Vélodrome on the occasion of the round of 32, is won by the African Club (1-0). In the context of the Tunisian Cup competitions, six derbys opposed the two teams before independence: one is won by the African Club in 1926, one ends with a draw and four by a victory of the Espérance sportive de Tunis, including two in the semifinals, in 1939 and 1947–1948.

The two teams entered into direct competition in the spring of 1933 and are now playing in the same division, with the exception of one season, sporting competition and competition between them taking over any desire to merge. It is at this period that, competition compels, are forged images truncated or at least oriented or manipulated of a city club and aristocrat for the African Club, solidly anchored in his stronghold of Bab Jedid, in opposition to his opponent being more popular and going to settle in Bab Souika. If this vision develops from the profiles of the leaders of the two clubs, the clubs certainly have more beldis among their ranks, no basis either supports or confirms this difference. On the contrary, the players of the African Club have, from time immemorial, of diverse social and geographical origins and it is the same for their supporters. The African Club and the EST play together in the elite from the 1937–1938 season, the EST having secured its accession to the first series at the end of the 1935–1936 season, the African Club l having joined a year later. The first derby in Ligue I took place on September 26, 1937, during the second day of the 1937–1938 season, and ended with a draw (1-1).

On November 13, 1955, clubman Mounir Kebaili scored in the 65th minute the first goal in the history of the derby since the independence of the country, his teammate Ridha Meddeb doubling the lead in the 71st and allowing his club to win on the score of 2 to 0 against Espérance sportive de Tunis. In 1969, the two clubs meet for the first time in the final of the Tunisian Cup: the African Club won on a score of 2 to 0 thanks to goals scored by Abderrahmane Rahmouni and Tahar Chaibi. The following year, while the African Club leads 1–0 at half-time, the players Esperance Sports Tunis decide not to return to the field for the second half following a corner disputed by the referee in the 41st minute; the FTF decides to replay the game which sees the African Club win on the score of 1 to 0.

On May 5, 1985, the African club won the match 5–1, causing their opponent his second biggest loss in a derby after the 1978 which ended in a score of 5 to 2. In 1995, while Esperance sportive de Tunis lead on a score of 4–0 in the 70th minute, the referee expels the fourth club player and stops the match. In 2006, after a long struggle of 120 minutes, Espérance sportive de Tunis won on penalties in the final of the Tunisian Cup. On January 27, 2007, after nine years without a win, the African Club won with a goal at the 87th Moussa Pokong. On May 1, 2010, for the first time in the league, a derby is played behind closed doors. The longest undefeated period for the African Club takes place between the seasons 1937-1938 and 1947-1948 (seven seasons played in eleven years, four seasons having been canceled due to World War II); EST is experiencing such a period between the 1998–1999 season and the first leg of the 2006–2007 season (8.5 seasons).

During the 2014–2015 season, the derby of the return phase of the championship, decisive for separating the two clubs of the capital on the one hand and the Etoile Sportive du Sahel on the other hand, is held on May 12, 2015. Designated « derby of the century "by some Tunisian media, the match ends with the victory of the club players, future champions of this season by a goal to zero. On January 6, 2019, for the first time in derby history, he plays outside the capital in Monastir due to the closure of the Rades Stadium due to maintenance. Esperance won 2-1

Stadiums

Stade Chedly Zouiten 

The Chedly-Zouiten Stadium (Arabic: ملعب الشاذلي زويتن), formerly called Geo-André Stadium, is a Tunisian stadium located in the Belvedere district of Tunis. It is a multi-purpose stadium of 18,000 spectators1, which hosted the 1965 African Cup of Nations. It is being renovated to host two matches of the 1994 Africa Cup of Nations. Long capital stadium of the capital, it was supplanted by the Olympic stadium of El Menzah in 1967 and then by the Olympic stadium of Radès in 2001, both larger and more modern. The Tunisian Stadium, the third club of the capital, elected home until 2011, the year of the inauguration of its own stadium, the Hedi-Enneifer stadium.

956/5000 It bears the name of Geo Andre, a French sportsman killed during the campaign in Tunisia, before taking that of Chedly Zouiten, a figure of Tunisian football. The Tunis municipality closed it on November 17, 2006, to carry out renovations estimated at 3.4 million dinars2 and initially caused by defects in the rainwater drainage channels. This cost includes the renovation of the stormwater drainage and drainage system, the renovation of the tribune of honor, the press gallery, lawn terraces, changing rooms, electrical installations; the works are launched on January 2, 2009, for a period of ten months2. It was not until May 20, 2012, that the stadium was finally reopened3. In search of a stadium specific to the football team of his club, Slim Riahi, president of the Club Africain, proposes in February 2013 an official offer to the Tunisian State concerning the acquisition of the stadium5. :

Stade Olympique d'El Menzah 

Stade Olympique El Menzah (Arabic: الملعب الأولمبي المنزه‎) is a multi-purpose stadium, located in the north of Tunis, Tunisia. It is built to host the 1967 Mediterranean Games at the same time as the Olympic swimming pool and gymnasium. Since then, it is an integral part of Tunisia's main sports complex. Tunisia's three major football teams, ES Tunis, Club Africain and Stade Tunisien played their games there. The stadium is completely renovated for the 1994 African Cup of Nations. It has a capacity of 39,858 seats. The VIP section consists of a grandstand and 2 salons that can accommodate 300 people in a "cocktail" configuration. The stadium hosted the matches of Tunisia national football team until the inauguration of the Stade 7 November in Radès in 2001. Sometimes the Stade El Menzah hosts entertainment events. Popstar Michael Jackson performed his first and only concert in Tunisia, at this stadium during his HIStory World Tour on October 7, 1996, in front of 90.000 fans. Sting performed at the stadium during his Brand New Day Tour on April 28, 2001. Mariah Carey kicked off The Adventures of Mimi Tour at the stadium on July 22 and 24, 2006.

Stade Olympique de Radès 

Stade Olympique de Radès (Arabic: الملعب الأولمبي برادس‎) is a multi-purpose stadium in Rades, Tunisia about 10 kilometers south-east of the city center of Tunis, in the center of the Olympic City. It is currently used mostly for football matches and it also has facilities for athletics. The stadium holds 65,000 and was built in 2001 for the 2001 Mediterranean Games and is considered to be one of the best stadiums in Africa. Built for the 2001 Mediterranean Games, the 65,000-seat covered area covers 13,000 m2 and consists of a central area, 3 adjoining grounds, 2 warm-up rooms, 2 paintings and an official stand of 7,000 seats. The press gallery is equipped with 300 desks. It was inaugurated in July 2001 for the final of the Tunisian Cup between CS Hammam-Lif and Étoile du Sahel (1-0). Club Africain and Espérance de Tunis play their major league matches here. Before the construction of this stadium, the Tunis derby used to be played in the 45,000 seat-capacity Stade El Menzah. It is also the stadium of Tunisia national football team since 2001. This stadium has hosted matches of the 2004 African Cup of Nations which was won by the Tunisian team. Ligue de Football Professionnel, which wants to relocate the Trophée des Champions opposing the Olympique de Marseille (OM) to Paris Saint-Germain (PSG), announces that the 2010 edition takes place at the stadium on 28 July 2010; It ended in a draw (0-0) in the presence of 57,000 spectators.

Stade Mustapha Ben Jannet 

Stade Mustapha Ben Jannet (Arabic: ملعب مصطفى بن جنات‎) is a multi-use stadium in Monastir, Tunisia. It is currently used by football team US Monastir, and was used for the 2004 African Cup of Nations. The stadium holds 20,000 people and is sometimes used as a home for the Tunisia national football team. The stadium is named after Mustapha Ben Jannet, a nationalist militant executed by the French guards and having gathered the footballers of Monastir around a football team: US Monastir. The stadium is integrated into the sports complex of the city of Monastir, Tunisia, located a few hundred meters from the city center, which extends over 11 hectares and includes a sports hall, an indoor swimming pool, a tennis complex and various golf courses, training. It hosts the matches of the resident team: US Monastir.

Inaugurated in 1958, this stadium with suspended tiers thanks to the technique of "cantilevered ball joint" used by the architect Olivier-Clément Cacoub initially offers a capacity of 3,000 places. Over time, several expansion works were carried out: its capacity was increased in the late 1990s to more than 10,000 places. On the occasion of the organization of the 2004 African Cup of Nations, new works allow to reach a capacity of 20,000 places.

Results

Before Independence

Tunisian League 1

Tunisian National Championship

Tunisian Ligue Professionnelle 1

Tunisian Cup results

Tunisian Super Cup results

Tunisian League Cup results

Statistics

Top scorers
 Hassen Bayou [Club Africain]: 9 goals
 Chedly Laaouini and Abdeljabar Machouche [Espérance Sportive de Tunis]: 7 goals
 Hedi Bayari and Zouheir Dhawedi [Club Africain]: 6 goals
 Mohamed Salah Jedidi [Club Africain] and Ayadi Hamrouni [Espérance Sportive de Tunis]: 5 goals

participations
Tarak Dhiab (ES Tunis): 29 derbies
Sadok Sassi (Club Africain) and Khaled Ben Yahia (ES Tunis): 27 derbies
Nabil Maâloul (ES Tunis Club Africain): 26 derbies (24 with ES Tunis and 2 with Club Africain)
Chokri El Ouaer (ES Tunis): 24 derbies

Tnisian Ligue Professionnelle 1 results

one club to another 
Due to intense rivalry between the two clubs, few players have dared to play for both the African Club and Esperance Tunis during their career. Apart from Mohamed Bachtobji, Mohamed Ali Yaakoubi and Ali Abdi, all the others have passed through other clubs, whether in Tunisia or abroad, before playing with the Club Africain or Espérance sportive de Tunis.

Club Africain then Espérance de Tunis 

 Ahmed Akaichi
 Mohamed Bachtobji
 Borhene Ghannem
 Walid Hichri
 Dramane Traore
 Khaled Mouelhi
 Karim Aouadhi
 Riadh Jelassi
 Seifeddine Akremi
 Mohamed Ali Yaakoubi
 Hichem Belkaroui
 Farouk Ben Mustapha
 Rached Arfaoui

Espérance de Tunis then Club Africain 

 Slama Kasdaoui
 Anis Amri
 Khaled Korbi
 Nabil Maâloul
 Mohamed Torkhani
 Skander Sheikh
 Foued Slama
 Saber Khalifa
 Ali Abdi
 Oussama Darragi

Arbitration 
Fathi Bouseta is the most governing referee for Derby with six meetings.

In 1995, after the referee took out four red cards, the match was halted in the 70th minute by Esperance (4-0).

 Tunisian refereeing crew: 88 matches
 Foreign referee: 31 matches

Popular culture 
The Tunis derby has a huge fan base in Tunisia, especially in the capital and the Greater Tunis region. The derby match has been under preparation for several weeks in order to prepare flags and inputs, which are represented in giant calligraphic images.

Before the Tunisian revolution, derby matches were supported by the fans of the two teams during the revolution. 2016 Both fans were invited to the match and it was one of the greatest derby matches in Tunisian football history.

Honors

Notes

References 

Football rivalries in Tunisia
Espérance Sportive de Tunis
Club Africain